The 2009 season is Washington Freedom's first season competing in the Women's Professional Soccer league, the top division of women's soccer in the United States, and seventh competitive season. The team was coached by  Jim Gabarra who has led the team since its founding in 2001.

Review
In January 2008, Washington was selected as one of the seven cities to launch Women’s Professional Soccer in spring 2009. The WPS would be the next iteration of a women’s professional league since the WUSA folded in 2003.

The Washington Freedom had been competing in the W-League since 2006, would begin the Washington franchise to field a WSP team. Still led by head coach Jim Gabarra, the coaching staff stayed intact transitioning to the new league. The initial player allocation aimed to keep players in preferred locations and best marketing potential, with the Freedom getting Abby Wambach, Cat Whitehill, and Ali Krieger (on loan from FFC Frankfurt).

The Freedom played in the league’s inaugural match on March 29, 2009, against Los Angeles Sol before a crowd of 14,382. They lost the match, 2–0, and struggled for the first three weeks. The Freedom picked up their first win of the WPS era back in California, beating FC Gold Pride, 3–4, thanks to a 90th-minute goal from Abby Wambach.

The season continued to be an up and down one with a strong run through June (going undefeated through 8 matches) followed by three consecutive losses. Winning four of their last five, the Freedom finished their first WPS regular season in 3rd place, earning their first playoff appearance.

The first round playoff match was a rematch of the last week of the season, where the Freedom defeated Sky Blue FC at home 3–1. Sky Blue would get revenge winning 2–1 at the Maryland SoccerPlex, thanks to an 85th-minute goal from Francielle.

Club

Roster
The first-team roster of Washington Freedom.

Team management
2009 coaching staff

Competition

Regular season

Regular-season standings

WPS playoffs
The Freedom finished 3rd in the table earning a place in the WPS Playoffs in a First Round match up versus 4th place Sky Blue FC. Despite having defeated Sky Blue on the final day of the regular season, the Freedom dropped the First Round match at home after conceding a late goal to Francielle.

Statistics

|-
|colspan="10"|Defenders:
|-

|-
|colspan="10"|Midfielders:
|-

|-
|colspan="10"|Forwards:
|-

|}

Goalkeepers

Honors and awards

Player of the Week

Player of the Month

Transfers
As part of the inaugural season, each of the league’s seven teams went through several mechanisms for player acquisitions to fill out their rosters. These included:
 WPS Player Allocation – allocation of existing US national team players across the league
 International Draft – draft of international players across the league
 General Draft – draft of existing professional players not active with their respective national teams
 Draft – inaugural college draft

In

Out

References

Washington Freedom
American soccer clubs 2009 season
2009 Women's Professional Soccer season
Sports
 
Sports in Washington, D.C., by year